The women's singles tournament of the 2015 BWF World Championships (World Badminton Championships) took place from August 10 to 16 in Jakarta, Indonesia.
. Carolina Marín enters as the 2014 World Champion.

Seeds

  Carolina Marín (champion)
  Saina Nehwal (final)
  Li Xuerui (third round)
  Tai Tzu-ying (quarterfinals)
  Ratchanok Intanon (third round)
  Wang Yihan (quarterfinals)
  Wang Shixian (quarterfinals)
  Sung Ji-hyun (semifinals)

  Nozomi Okuhara (second round)
  Bae Yeon-ju (third round)
  P. V. Sindhu (quarterfinals)
  Michelle Li (third round)
  Minatsu Mitani (second round)
  Sayaka Takahashi (third round)
  Busanan Ongbumrungpan (third round)
  Maria Febe Kusumastuti (second round)

Draw

Finals

Section 1

Section 2

Section 3

Section 4

References

BWF Website

2015 BWF World Championships
BWF